Exetel is an Australian ISP which provides ADSL, web hosting, VoIP, and other internet services to customers across Australia. Exetel's headquarters are in offices in Sydney, and its switching centres are distributed in capital city secure data centre facilities around mainland Australia.

Exetel resells products from NBN Co, Telstra, Optus and AAPT. Many of the larger Australian ISPs have chosen to deploy their own infrastructure (including wireless) in order to provide faster and less expensive services than Telstra offers. Exetel does not deploy its own infrastructure outside of its own switching centres. Instead, it is a wholesale customer of Tier 1 wholesale telco providers who provide IP Transit, Inter-capital Transmission and various Residential and Business Grade Access Network products that Exetel integrate and manage for its customers.

History
Exetel began operating in the early 1990s as a technology consulting company, providing technical and management consulting services until December 2003. At that time the Exetel administration decided to become a service provider of data and telephone communications services.

It began offering ADSL1 services in mid-February 2004, SHDSL corporate services in April 2004 and wireless broadband through Unwired in June 2004. Towards the end of 2004 Exetel added wire line telephony services using the Verizon network and mobile services using the Vodafone network. Exetel activated its own VoIP switches in March 2006 and began offering ADSL2+ services on 20 July 2006.

Exetel has PoPs in New South Wales, Victoria, Queensland, South Australia, Western Australia, Australian Capital Territory and Auckland.

On 18 November 2007 Exetel was included in the Deloitte's Rising Star listings as one of the fastest growing 50 Australian technology companies with a cumulative growth of 159% in that two-year period.

In June 2021, Superloop acquired Exetel for $110 million in cash and shares.

Services
Exetel offers the following internet related services:

 NBN using all access technologies except Satellite
Mobile Voice Services
Mobile Broadband Services
Home Wireless Broadband Services
ADSL/ADSL2+
 Wireless Ethernet
 Mid-Band Ethernet/Ethernet over Copper
 Ethernet over Fibre
 Residential and business web hosting
 VoIP
 POTS telephony

Bandwidth management 
Exetel has over 300Gbit/s of bandwidth linking its customers to Exetel and over 300Gbit/s+ of bandwidth linking Exetel to national and international internet networks. Multiple 10Gbit connections to numerous peering networks are used to ensure maximum content availability and network adjacency. Since it began operating, Exetel has implemented various practices to provide the maximum levels of on-net content to ensure the best possible end-user experience including Google, Akamai and Netflix caches.

Uncounted/off-peak period 
When it began operating Exetel took the unusual step of providing users with significant "free" data in an attempt to manage its bandwidth more effectively. It actively encourages users to carry out their heavy downloads during what is currently called either the "uncounted" or "off-peak" period. Times and allowances during this period have also varied since the policy was first implemented in February 2004. As of 21 July 2009 the off-peak period extends from midnight to midday AEST and the allowance within this period is 60GB per month. This period and its allowance is available to all residential ADSL and ADSL2+ customers, except those on bundled ADSL plans or zero quota ADSL2+ plans.

Despite there being a defined limit in the uncounted/off-peak period, Exetel does not actively prevent customers from downloading beyond that limit. While it used to discourage such action by placing users who exceed the limit in any month into separate bandwidth pools for the remainder of the month it, as of 1 February 2008, began applying excess charges to any downloads beyond the off-peak limit.

, there are new terms for broadband, NBN and mobile that include various data limits including free/unlimited data options.

References

External links

Companies based in Sydney
Internet service providers of Australia
Privately held companies of Australia
Telecommunications companies established in 2001
2001 establishments in Australia